The Time with You is a 1948 German drama film directed by George Hurdalek and starring Eva Ingeborg Scholz, Heinz Klingenberg and Peter Bürger.

It was made at the Bavaria Studios in Munich. The film's sets were designed by the art director Gerhard Ladner.

Cast

References

Bibliography 
 Bock, Hans-Michael & Bergfelder, Tim. The Concise Cinegraph: Encyclopaedia of German Cinema. Berghahn Books, 2009.

External links 
 

1948 films
1948 drama films
German drama films
West German films
1940s German-language films
Films directed by George Hurdalek
Films shot at Bavaria Studios
German black-and-white films
1940s German films